Joseph Hunt defeated Jack Kramer 6–3, 6–8, 10–8, 6–0 in the final to win the men's singles tennis title at the 1943 U.S. National Championships.

Draw

Key
 Q = Qualifier
 WC = Wild card
 LL = Lucky loser
 r = Retired

Finals

Earlier rounds

Section 1

Section 2

References

External links
 1943 U.S. National Championships on ITFtennis.com, the source for this draw

Men's Singles
1943